Andrea Danzi (born 25 February 1999) is an Italian professional footballer who plays as a midfielder for Cittadella in the Italian Serie B.

Club career
Born in San Martino Buon Albergo, Danzi spent his entire youth career with Hellas Verona and rose quickly through their youth sides. On 2 July 2017, he signed his first professional contract with them, keeping him at Hellas Verona until 2021. Danzi made his professional debut for Hellas Verona in a 1–0 Serie A loss to U.S. Sassuolo Calcio on 18 April 2018.

On 25 January 2021, he moved to Ascoli on loan.

On 25 June 2021, he signed with Cittadella.

References

External links
 
 FIGC Profile
 Serie A Profile
 

1999 births
Living people
Sportspeople from the Province of Verona
Association football midfielders
Italian footballers
Italy youth international footballers
Hellas Verona F.C. players
Ascoli Calcio 1898 F.C. players
A.S. Cittadella players
Serie A players
Serie B players
Footballers from Veneto